The Sterling Warriors are the athletic teams that represent Sterling College, located in Sterling, Kansas, in intercollegiate sports as a member of the National Association of Intercollegiate Athletics (NAIA), primarily competing in the Kansas Collegiate Athletic Conference (KCAC) since the 1958–59 academic year; which they were a member on a previous stint from 1902–03 to December 1928 (of the 1928–29 school year).

Varsity sports
Sterling competes in 23 intercollegiate varsity sports: Men's sports include baseball, basketball, cross country, football, golf, powerlifting, soccer, swimming, tennis and track & field (indoor and outdoor); while women's sports include basketball, cross country, golf, powerlifting, soccer, softball, swimming, tennis, track & field (indoor and outdoor) and volleyball; and co-ed sports include cheerleading.

Football
Football at Sterling comes off the 2009 season with a fourth-place finish in the conference and a 6–4 record.  Chuck Lambert is the program's current head coach, succeeding his brother Andy, the new coach at Southern Nazarene, Okla.  Notable former athletes include actor Clarence Gilyard.

During the 1905 season, the Coleman Company set up temporary gas-powered lighting for a night game against Fairmount College (now called Wichita State University). It was the first night football game played west of the Mississippi River.  Fairmount won the game 24–0.

In 2013 the Warriors, led by Andy Lambert, went 8–1 in Conference play, winning their first ever Kansas Collegiate Athletic Conference football title. That season also marks the first time qualifying for the NAIA football playoffs

References

External links